Robert Harper (1 February 1842 – 9 January 1919) was an Australian politician. Born in Glasgow, Scotland, he was educated at Glasgow Academy and migrated to Australia in 1856, becoming a tea and coffee merchant and a pastoralist. In 1879, he was elected to the Victorian Legislative Assembly as the member for West Bourke; he was defeated in 1880, but in 1882 returned to the Assembly as the member for East Bourke. He was defeated again in 1889, but was returned as member for East Bourke 1891–97. In the first federal election in 1901, he was elected to the Australian House of Representatives as the Protectionist member for Mernda. He joined the Commonwealth Liberal Party when it was formed out of the fusion of the Protectionists and the Anti-Socialists. Harper's seat of Mernda was abolished in 1913, and he retired. He died in 1919.

References

|-

1842 births
1919 deaths
Protectionist Party members of the Parliament of Australia
Commonwealth Liberal Party members of the Parliament of Australia
Members of the Australian House of Representatives for Mernda
Members of the Australian House of Representatives
Victoria (Australia) state politicians
20th-century Australian politicians
People educated at the Glasgow Academy
Scottish emigrants to colonial Australia
19th-century Australian businesspeople
Politicians from Glasgow
Businesspeople from Glasgow